Charles W. Michael (died January 23, 1915) was a politician from Maryland. He served in the Maryland Senate in 1896.

Early life
Charles W. Michael was born to Jackson Michael.

Career
Michael was a Democrat. Michael served in the Maryland Senate, representing Harford County, in 1896. He succeeded William Benjamin Baker who resigned.

Personal life
Michael did not marry.

Michael died on January 23, 1915, at his "Buttonwood" home in Perryman, Maryland, at the age of 64. He was buried at Spesutia Protestant Episcopal Church.

References

Year of birth missing
1915 deaths
People from Perryman, Maryland
Democratic Party Maryland state senators